Bela of Britonia (? - 675 - ?) was a medieval Galician clergyman.

References 
 Episcopologio Mindoniense. CAL PARDO, Enrique, 2003, .

External links 

  Official web site of the Diocese of Mondoñedo-Ferrol

7th-century Galician bishops